{{DISPLAYTITLE:C20H24N2O}}
The molecular formula C20H24N2O (molar mass: 308.42 g/mol, exact mass: 308.1889 u) may refer to:

 Affinisine
 Indecainide

Molecular formulas